Flowers is a series of yuri-themed visual novel video games developed by Innocent Grey. The first entry, Flowers: Le Volume sur Printemps, was released in 2014; three more games were released in 2015, 2016, and 2017.

Titles

Video games
 Flowers: Le Volume sur Printemps is the first game in the series. It was released for Microsoft Windows on 18 April 2014, and by Prototype for PlayStation Portable and PlayStation Vita on 9 October 2014. The game was released in English for Microsoft Windows on 17 August 2016.
 Flowers: Le Volume sur Été is the second game in the series. It was released for Microsoft Windows on 17 April 2015, and by Prototype for PlayStation Portable and PlayStation Vita on 22 October 2015. The game was released in English for Microsoft Windows on 15 July 2018 with a Steam release planned for 25 July 2018. 
 Flowers: Le Volume sur Automne is the third game in the series. It was released for Microsoft Windows on 27 May 2016, and by Prototype for PlayStation Vita on 17 November 2016. An English release was announced on 5 July 2018.
 Flowers: Le Volume sur Hiver is the fourth game in the series. It was released for Microsoft Windows on 15 September 2017, and on 16 March 2018 for PlayStation Vita.
 Flowers: Les Quatre Saisons is a collection of all four games. It was released for the PlayStation 4 on 7 March 2019 in Japan.

Other media
In addition to the video games, other media based on the series has been released: Six audio dramas have been published, as part of the limited editions of the Microsoft Windows and console versions of each game; the games' music has been published as three soundtrack albums; and two fanbooks based on the first two games have been released.

Development
The Flowers series is developed by Innocent Grey, with art by Miki Sugina. Unlike their previous games, the developers decided to not focus on characters' deaths, instead depicting female students' everyday life, and how they cooperate to solve mysteries. Even prior to the first game's release, it was decided that there would be four games, representing the four seasons.

During their panel at Anime Expo in July 2015, JAST USA announced that they would localize and publish the first game in late 2015; the localized demo was eventually released in February 2016, with the full game planned for both physical and digital release in March 2016. Due to translation errors, JAST USA had to delay the game to allow time for heavy editing and quality assurance; the game was eventually released in English in August 2016.

Reception

The series has been well received by critics. Marcus Estrada of Hardcore Gamer called Primtemps release "great news for yuri fans", and described the series' artwork as "gorgeous".

References

External links 
 
  

Android (operating system) games
PlayStation 4 games
PlayStation Portable games
PlayStation Vita games
Romance video games
Video games featuring female protagonists
Video game franchises introduced in 2014
Video games developed in Japan
Visual novels
Windows games
Yuri (genre) video games